Lebia guttula is a blackish-brown species of beetle in the family Carabidae. It is found in Alberta and British Columbia, Canada as well as southern California, western Texas and southern New Mexico.

References

Further reading

 
 
 
 

Lebia
Beetles described in 1851
Taxa named by John Lawrence LeConte